Holmes & Yoyo is an American comedy television series that aired on ABC for 13 episodes during the 1976-1977 season. The series follows police detective Holmes and his new android partner, Yoyo, on their misadventures investigating crimes.

Premise
Detective Alexander Holmes is a down-on-his-luck cop who chronically injures his partners. The department gives him a new partner, Gregory "Yoyo" Yoyonovich, who is clumsy and naive, but good-natured and very strong. During one of their first cases together, Yoyo is shot, and Holmes discovers that his new partner is an android, a sophisticated new crime-fighting machine designed by the police department as their secret weapon. Over the course of the series, Holmes teaches Yoyo how to be more human, while trying to keep his quirky partner's true nature a secret, from both criminals and fellow cops.

Cast
 Richard B. Shull as Detective Alexander Holmes
 John Schuck as his partner Gregory "Yoyo" Yoyonovich.
 Co-stars included Andrea Howard and Bruce Kirby.
 Jay Leno appeared in the pilot as a gas station attendant.

Production

Development
The executive producer was Leonard Stern, a former staff writer for and executive producer of Get Smart, which featured an android character named Hymie who was largely a prototype for Yoyo. Several episodes of Holmes & Yoyo were directed by John Astin. John Schuck also appeared as SFPD Detective Sgt. Charles Enright in the McMillan And Wife made-for-television films that starred Rock Hudson alongside Susan Saint James, of which Stern was also creator and executive producer.

Yoyo's abilities

Besides super-strength, Yoyo's other abilities include speed reading, and the ability to analyze clues at the scene. Yoyo had a built-in Polaroid camera:  each time his nose was pressed, a Polaroid photograph of his view would be taken and ejected from his shirt pocket. Yoyo's control panel was built into his chest, which could be opened by pulling his tie. The level of Yoyo's batteries was critical, because if they ran down his memory and, effectively, his being would be erased. In one episode his batteries came very close to running down completely, and he was charged by being pushed against an electric fence with his arms extended. Yoyo weighed 427 pounds, and his heavy build could absorb the shock of a bomb.

Much of the show's comedy was derived from Yoyo's constant malfunctions. Some of his common problems included:

Uncontrollably spinning head over heels when near an electric garage door that was opening or closing.
Bullets causing him to break out dancing
Magnets flying at him
Picking up radio signals from Sweden
A slew of Polaroid photos spewing from his shirt pocket when a criminal punched him in the nose
When asked about his previous assignment, he would reply, "The bunco squad," then continue to repeat the phrase no matter what the questioner said, as if he were a skipping record.

Another running gag involved Yoyo's ability to read an entire book by simply fanning its pages; his invariable comment after doing so was, "Thanks for the book! I really enjoyed reading it."

Episodes

Reception
The series performed poorly and was cancelled after 11 episodes, with the 2 final episodes produced shown the following August. It ranked number 33 on TV Guide's List of the 50 Worst TV Shows of All Time. A few series with similar premises but varying treatment followed, including ABC's Future Cop with Ernest Borgnine and Michael J. Shannon the following year, the 1993 series Mann & Machine, and the 2013 series Almost Human.

Home media
Holmes & Yoyo was released in France on Region 2 DVD in 2016 under the title Holmes et Yoyo - Intégrale de la série. The audio is French only, with no English option.

References

External links
 

American Broadcasting Company original programming
1970s American comic science fiction television series
1970s American sitcoms
1976 American television series debuts
1977 American television series endings
Television series by Universal Television
Androids in television
1970s American police comedy television series
Television duos
Television series about robots
Television shows set in Los Angeles